The Amilkhvari was a noble house of Georgia which rose to prominence in the fifteenth century and held a large fiefdom in central Georgia until the Imperial Russian annexation of the country in 1801. They were hereditary marshals (amilakhvar/amilakhor) of Georgia from c. 1433, from which the family takes its name. Subsequently, the family was received among the princes (knyaz) of the Empire under the name of Amilakhvarov (1825) and Amilakhvari (Амилахвари, 1850). Till the 17th century their family residence was in Skhvilo castle, when they moved to Kvemo Chala castle.

History 
 
The House of Zevdginidze (ზევდგინიძე) or Zedginidze (ზედგინიძე), which subsequently assumed the name of its principal office-fief, of Amilakhvari (amirakhori, i.e., Prince-Master of the Horse; deputy Amirspasalar, i.e., Lord High Constable), is traceable in the province of Upper Kartli (now Inner Kartli) to the middle of the fourteenth century. A family legend held it that they descended from a Roman officer who accompanied Pompey on his Caucasian campaign in 65 BC. His descendants are said to have attained to Georgian nobility in the 11th century.

Since then they are called Amilakhvari and are divided by several names:,

    1. Revazis shvili [shvili-son, child];

    2. Khimshiashvil  

    2. Qaikhosros shvili;

    3. Bezhanis shvili;

                                                                    4. Erastis shvili and his nephews;

                                                                    5. Givis shvili.

The family rose to an especial prominence with Joatham Zedginidze, who at the risk of his life saved King George VIII of Georgia (1446–1465) from the plot formed by the renegade nobles. George VIII must have elevated Joatham's eldest son, T'aqa II (or Joatham himself before he died of the wounds he had received) to the new title and offices. The family was enfeoffed of the offices of amilakhvari, sardali (commander) of the Banner of Upper Kartli, and mouravi (Palatine) of Gori, as well as of numerous fiefs, including the sepulchral abbey and cathedral of Samtavisi, the town of Kaspi and several villages on the left bank of the Mtkvari River. Their fiefdom was called Saamilakhvro (Samilakhoro), literally meaning "of Amilakhvari". The family briefly held also the duchies of Ksani (1741–1747) and of Argavi (1743–1747).

In the 17th and 18th centuries, the Zedginidze house ranked as fourth – after the Bagration-Mukhraneli, and the eristavi (ducal) dynasties of Aragvi and of Ksani – among the "undivided" princely houses of the Kingdom of Kartli. It was then that the name Amilakhvari became a surname of the heads of the house; the cadets being called Amilakhvarishvili. Beyond this principal line, the dynasty branched out as the Princes Khidirbekishvili in the provinces of Samtskhe and Inner Kartli, and as the Princes Guramishvili and the Princes Tusishvili in Kakheti. The Emukhvari family of Abkhazia is also supposed to be another line of this dynasty. The Amilakhvari were related through marriage with several other noble houses of Georgia and the royal Bagrationi dynasty. After the Russian annexation of Georgia (1801) the family was received among the princes (knyaz) of the Empire under the name of Amilakhvarov (Амилахваровы, Амилохваровы, 1825) and Amilakhvari (Амилахвари, 1850).

Prominent members 
Tamar Amilakhori (fl. 17th-century), favourite concubine of Safavid king Abbas I
Abd-ol-Ghaffar Amilakhori (fl. 17th-century), leading Safavid Iranian noble
Givi Amilakhvari (1689-1754), political and military leader
Alexander Amilakhvari (1750-1802), political writer
Ivane Amilakhvari (1829-1905), general in Russian service
Dimitri Amilakhvari (1906-1942), a French hero of World War II

See also 

List of Georgian princely families

References 

 
 იოანე ბატონიშვილი (Ioane Bagrationi; 1768–1830). "ამილახვრიანნი" (Amilakhvari). შემოკლებით აღწერა საქართველოსა შინა მცხოვრებთა თავადთა და აზნაურთა გვარებისა (The Brief Description of the Georgian Noble Houses). Retrieved on August 4, 2007.
Toumanoff, Cyril. Studies in Christian Caucasian History, Georgetown University Press, Washington, 1967.
Allen, William Edward David; Muratoff, Paul (1953). Caucasian Battlefields: A History of the Wars on the Turco-Caucasian Border 1828–1921. Cambridge University Press. pp. 23, 31, 33, 42.
https://khimshiashvilis.com/

Noble families of Georgia (country)
Russian noble families
Georgian-language surnames